Alderetes is a city in the Cruz Alta Department, Tucumán Province, Argentina. It is bordered in the north by the Burruyacu Department, in the east by the "comunas rurales" of La Florida-Luisiana, Delfín Gallo and Colombres; in the south by the city of Banda del Río Salí (The Cruz Alta Department seat), and in the west by the Salí River.

A predominantly industrial spot, Alderetes was incorporated on September 1, 1987), as part of the San Miguel de Tucumán metropolitan area.

Populated places in Tucumán Province
Populated places established in 1987
1987 establishments in Argentina